William Morgan Nye (28 April 1829 – 22 September 1905) was a member of the Wisconsin State Assembly.

Biography
Nye was born in Herkimer County, New York. He moved with his family to Wisconsin when he was seventeen, settling in the Town of Beloit, Wisconsin. In 1860, Nye married Fannie Miller (1839–1882); the couple had two children.

Career
Nye was a member of the Assembly in 1887. Previously, he had served as Assessor of the Town of Beloit. He was a Republican.

References

1829 births
1905 deaths
People from Herkimer County, New York
People from Beloit, Wisconsin
Republican Party members of the Wisconsin State Assembly
19th-century American politicians